Soyuz TM-31 was the first Soyuz spaceflight to dock with the International Space Station (ISS). The spacecraft carried the members of Expedition 1, the first long-duration ISS crew. It was launched from Baikonur Cosmodrome in Kazakhstan at 07:52 UT on October 31, 2000, by a Soyuz-U rocket.

The crew consisted of Russian cosmonauts Yuri Gidzenko and Sergei Krikalev, and American William Shepherd. Gidzenko was Commander of the flight up, but once aboard the station, Shepherd became Commander of the long-duration mission Expedition 1.

Crew

References

Crewed Soyuz missions
Spacecraft launched in 2000
Orbital space tourism missions
Spacecraft which reentered in 2001
Spacecraft launched by Soyuz-U rockets
Dennis Tito